A motor is a mechanical or electrical device that creates motion.
Electric motor, an electrical device that creates motion.

Motor or Motors may also refer to:

Motor vehicle, a self-propelled road vehicle
Mator or Motor language, extinct since the 1840s, a Uralic language that was spoken in the northern region of the Sayan Mountains in Siberia
The Motors, a British pub rock/punk band, formed in 1977 by Nick Garvey, Andy McMaster, Ricky Slaughter and Rob Hendry, who was replaced by Bram Tchaikovsky the same year
Motor (Australian magazine), formerly known as Modern Motor, an Australian magazine
Motor (American magazine), an American automobile monthly
Motor (Indonesian magazine), a defunct Indonesian automobile monthly magazine
The Motor, formerly known as Motorcycling and Motoring, a defunct British magazine
Motor control, use of the brain in humans/animals to activate/coordinate muscles and limbs, etc.
Motor, Iowa, a small town in Iowa, USA
Motor skill, development in babies of learning coordination and usage of muscles, limbs, etc.
Motor cortex, part of brain involved in movement
Molecular motor, biological molecular machine

See also
Engine (disambiguation)